Hemiaspis signata (common names: black-bellied swamp snake and marsh snake) is a species of venomous elapid snake endemic to Australia, where it is found along the east coast.

Recognisable by two distinctive narrow white lines on the face, the colour can range from pale olive to black top with a dark grey to black belly.  Adults can grow to 70 cm in length, but most specimens are smaller than this.  Their diet consists mainly of skinks and frogs.

It was first described in 1859 by Giorgio Jan as Alecto signata.

References

Further reading
Boulenger GA. 1896. Catalogue of the Snakes in the British Museum (Natural History). Volume III., Containing the Colubridæ (Opisthoglyphæ and Proteroglyphæ) ... London: Trustees of the British Museum (Natural History). (Taylor and Francis, printers). xiv + 727 pp. + Plates I-XXV. (Denisonia signata, pp. 338–339).
Jan G, Sordelli F. 1873. Iconographie générale des Ophidiens, Quarante-troisième livraison. Paris: Baillière. Index + Plates I-VI. (Alecto signata, Plate VI, figure 5). (in French).

Reptiles described in 1859
signata
Snakes of Australia
Reptiles of New South Wales
Reptiles of Queensland
Taxa named by Giorgio Jan